Hraničky is a settlement located in the Rychlebské Hory (Reichensteiner Gebirge in German) in the north-eastern part of Moravia in the Czech Republic, a territory historically known as Sudetenland.

Establishment

The mountain village lies about 12 km south-west from the town Javorník (Jauernig in German) and historically always belonged to the township of Nové Vilémovice (Neu Wilmsdorf in German). In 1785 the settlers founded the village in a broad valley under the Špičák mountain (Spitzberg in German) on the border as drawn by the Silesian Wars, then dissecting Bohemian Silesia from the newly Prussian-annexed Silesia, now a part of Poland. Hraničky was initially exclusively settled by ethnic German farmers, who came to the area from the Northern Moravian districts Králíky and Staré Město.

Because of the elevation (696 m), the people of Hraničky were only able to grow barley and most of them worked as forest workers. By 1836, the village had 26 houses and farmhouses, and 281 inhabitants. Also from 1811, Hraničky had a resident teacher and by 1885 also a school. A small Roman Catholic church was built in the northern part of the village in 1809. Heinrich Förster, prince-bishop of Breslau, leading the Catholics on both sides of the new border, also sponsored the building of the St. Joseph chapel in Hraničky as a gift to the village on its 100-year anniversary of existence.

Recent history

After 1945, under the Beneš decrees most Sudeten Germans were denaturalised and forced to leave Czechoslovakia. All but four families were expelled from Hraničky by 1946 and 3 years later the village was empty. In the early 1950s, a former resident Franz Schlegel and his family all of whom successfully avoided the expulsion of Germans, moved back to one of the farmhouses and continued living there until the early 1970s. The rest of the village, however, remained unoccupied and therefore in 1959 the Czechoslovakian communist government decided to completely destroy the settlement. In the summer 1960, the Czechoslovakian Army demolished nearly every standing structure in Hraničky, including the local church and St. Joseph's chapel. The only remaining buildings were two farmhouses occupied by the Schlegel family.

Today, the picturesque, former village Hraničky is once again empty. The last still standing structure is a mountain cottage owned by the members of the Royal family of Bavaria, the Wittelsbachs.

Resources

 Web-page about the Rychlebské Hory and Jeseníky area: http://www.rychleby-jeseniky.cz
 Web-page about the Rychlebské Hory region: http://www.rychleby.cz
 Web-page about no longer existing and disappearing settlements in Sudetenland: http://www.zanikleobce.cz/index.php?obec=982

References

 Pachl, Hans – Jauernig und das Jauerniger Ländchen. Ein Heimatbuch des ehemaligen Gerichtsbezirks Jauernig – 1983
 Ludwig, Gernot und Kurt Wolf – Jauernig und das Jauerniger Ländchen. Das 2. Heimatbuch des ehemaligen Gerichtsbezirkes Jauernig – 1995

History of Moravia
Villages in Jeseník District